András Lányi (born 26 November 1969) is a retired Hungarian tennis player.

Lányi has a career high ATP singles ranking of 374 achieved on 19 June 1989. He also has a career high ATP doubles ranking of 194, achieved on 6 February 1995. Lányi has won 3 ITF Satellite tournament doubles title.
 
Lányi has represented Hungary at Davis Cup, where he has a win–loss record of 12–13.

He was studied at University of Southern California, between 1989-1993. He won the NCAA Men's Team Championship in 1993 with Trojans. His teammates was Wayne Black, David Ekerot, Jon Leach, Brian MacPhie and Kent Seton, and they earned All-America selection that year.

He competed at the 1993 Summer Universiade. In mixed doubles he won bronze medal with Virág Csurgó.

Satellite and Challenger finals

Singles: 1 (0–1)

Doubles 8 (3–5)

Davis Cup

Participations: (12–13)

   indicates the outcome of the Davis Cup match followed by the score, date, place of event, the zonal classification and its phase, and the court surface.

After retirement
He founded a financial services company in Hungary in 2004 and is still managing director. In July 2007 Lányi elected from vice-president to the Hungarian Tennis Association. In 2009 he elected for the president of Hungarian Triathlon Association and held the position until 2012.

Sources

External links
 
 
 

1969 births
Living people
Hungarian male tennis players
USC Trojans men's tennis players
Universiade medalists in tennis
Universiade bronze medalists for Hungary
Medalists at the 1993 Summer Universiade
20th-century Hungarian people
21st-century Hungarian people